The Lanzhou–Chengdu–Chongqing Pipeline is a petroleum product pipeline in China.  The pipeline is owned by PetroChina.

The  pipeline starts at the Lanzhou terminal and finish at the Chongqing terminal. It runs through Gansu, Shaanxi and Sichuan provinces. The pipeline has capacity over 6 million tonnes of oil products per year. The pipeline cost around US$500 million.

References

Energy infrastructure completed in 2002
Oil pipelines in China
Refined oil product pipelines
2002 establishments in China